The Trial of Lee Harvey Oswald is a 1964 American legal drama film directed by Larry Buchanan. It is the first speculative trial drama about Lee Harvey Oswald, the assassin of U.S. President John F. Kennedy and murderer of Dallas police officer J. D. Tippit. Produced in Dallas only a few months after the assassination and Oswald's murder by Jack Ruby, the film attempts to simulate Oswald's trial if he had lived. The prosecution asserts that Oswald committed the crime for political reasons based in his Marxist beliefs, while his attorney presents an insanity defense, claiming that he had suffered from untreated paranoid schizophrenia since adolescence. As the viewer acts as a juror, with the judge and attorneys looking straight into the camera and talking directly to the unseen "jury" several times, no verdict is given. Dallas criminal defense attorney Charles W. Tessmer appears after the film to summarize its contents and to encourage viewers to debate among themselves.

Cast 
Charles Mazyrack as Lee Harvey Oswald
George Edgley as Presiding Judge 
Arthur Nations as Prosecuting Attorney Atkins 
George R. Russell as Defense Attorney Tyler
Howard Ware as a Bailiff

See also
List of American films of 1964

References

External links

The Trial of Lee Harvey Oswald at BFI

1964 films
Films about the assassination of John F. Kennedy
1964 drama films
American alternate history films
American courtroom films
Cultural depictions of Lee Harvey Oswald
Films directed by Larry Buchanan
1960s English-language films
1960s American films